Jerschke is a German surname. Notable people with the surname include:

 Günther Jerschke (1921–1997), German actor
 Oskar Jerschke (1861–1928), German playwright

See also
 Jeschke

German-language surnames